Oklahoma has a large network of numbered highways maintained by the state. These roads fall into one of three categories: Interstate Highways, U.S. Highways, and state highways. Interstate and U.S. Highways are continuous with surrounding states, while state highways are not (though Oklahoma and another state's department of transportation may coordinate numbering).

The majority of the numbered highways within Oklahoma are maintained by the Oklahoma Department of Transportation (ODOT). The only exceptions are sections of Interstate 44 (I-44) and U.S. Highway 412 (US 412), which run along turnpikes maintained by the Oklahoma Turnpike Authority (OTA). (I-44 runs along the H.E. Bailey, Turner, and Will Rogers turnpikes; US 412 is signed along the Cimarron and Cherokee turnpikes.)

Individual counties may establish a numbering system to apply to roads that they maintain. These highways are not listed here.

State highways
Oklahoma's state highways serve as the second-lowest tier on the Oklahoma road system. They are marked with a number contained inside an outline of the state, having been formerly marked inside a white circle in a black box until January 2006.

SH-81 has not been issued for a state highway so that is not confused with US Highways and Interstates bearing the same number designation. SH-35 has been issued, but it is only for a short spur, far from I-35. SH-60, SH-62, SH-69, and SH-75 were once assigned but these designation have since been revoked. Other two-digit highways that have yet to be assigned include: SH-12, SH-13, SH-21, SH-41, SH-57, SH-61, SH-68, and SH-90. SH-40 was once issued, but was absorbed into U.S. Highway 177; see SH-40A. SH-41, which was an east-west route across west-central Oklahoma that began at the intersection of S.W. 29th and May Avenue in Oklahoma City and veered southwest to Mustang, Union City and Minco before continuing west through Binger, Eakly, Cordell and Sayre and then crossing the Texas border near Sweetwater, was redesignated as SH-152 over its entire length in 1955. Across the Texas Panhandle, the highway continues as TX-152 to Dumas, Texas. SH-61 had a strange east-west route across south-central Oklahoma that started at SH-13 (Now SH-3W). Where it headed south, passing through Vanoss and then to Roff, where it turned east to Fittstown. It then headed south with SH-99 until turning east again. The road turned north in Jessie. It went north until it turned back east north of Stonewall It turned east again until it ended on SH-48 in Luna.

Many Oklahoma state highways have short spur routes connecting them to towns which lie off of the main route. Many times, these bear the same number as the parent highway, with a letter suffix. Some state highway spurs and loops from US highways have designations that are drawn from the parent US Highway designation.

As higher-level roads replaced sections of some routes, those sections sometimes had their designation revoked. This led to some highways being fragmented, missing one or more sections in the middle of the road. There are also a few unrelated highways that are designated in completely different parts of the state with the same number.

See also

List of Interstate Highways in Oklahoma
List of U.S. Highways in Oklahoma
 List of unsigned Oklahoma State Highways

References

External links
 OKHighways
 State highway map from the Oklahoma Department of Transportation (~2 MB)
 Oklahoma Digital Maps: Digital Collections of Oklahoma and Indian Territory

 
State highways